Samuel Mitchell Taylor (May 25, 1852 – September 13, 1921) was a U.S. Representative from Arkansas, father of Chester W. Taylor.

Born near Fulton, Mississippi, Taylor attended the public schools.
He studied law.
He was admitted to the bar in Tupelo, Mississippi, and commenced practice in 1876.
He served as member of the State house of representatives in 1879 and 1880.
He moved to Pine Bluff, Arkansas, in 1887, where he continued the practice of law.
He served as prosecuting attorney of the eleventh judicial district of Arkansas 1888-1892.
He served as delegate to the Democratic National Convention in 1896.

Taylor was elected as a Democrat to the Sixty-third Congress.

Taylor was subsequently elected to the Sixty-second Congress to fill the vacancy caused by the resignation of Joseph T. Robinson.
He was reelected to the Sixty-fourth and to the three succeeding Congresses and served from January 15, 1913, until his death in Washington, D.C., September 13, 1921.
He was interred in Bellewood Cemetery, Pine Bluff, Arkansas.

See also
List of United States Congress members who died in office (1900–49)

References

Samuel M. Taylor, Memorial addresses delivered in the House of Representatives and Senate frontispiece 1922

1852 births
1921 deaths
Democratic Party members of the United States House of Representatives from Arkansas
Democratic Party members of the Arkansas House of Representatives
People from Fulton, Mississippi
Politicians from Pine Bluff, Arkansas